is a song by Mao Abe.

The song is a first of a series of songs Abe has written with the title ending with no desu, with the second being  on the "Itsu no Hi mo" single.

Writing

The song is an arpeggio song, with lyrics about unrequited love. The author wrote someone a letter about wanting to get to know them more, which they have not replied to. They want to know the answers to simple questions, like "What sort of person do you like?" or "How long do you like a girls' hair to be?" The author wants to watch summer fireworks with the person, and shamelessly admits that they want to be his lover.

Abe wrote the song at the start of her final high school year, starting from the lyrics . She wanted to write a simple song about wanting to be in love. The song is autobiographical, about a boy Abe liked who would not return her email.

The song was one she performed a lot at high school-era lives, and was a favourite among her early listeners.

Recording, release

The song was the first song Abe posted to her MySpace, prior to her debut. The posted version was an acoustic demo recorded by Abe, which was later posted to iTunes as her first digital download single. The studio version was recorded in mid 2008, during the recording sessions for Abe's debut album Free. It was held back from the album as Abe considered it worth being an A-side song, and should be released in the summertime.

While the original recording was performed acoustically, the studio version has a band backing. Abe wanted the studio version to not have any background vocals or embellishments, to fit with the song's simplicity.

The song was mixed by Grammy award winning mix engineer David Thoener.

Music video

The music video was shot by director Masaki Ohkita. It is a continuous shot of Abe walking through her former high school (Ōita West High School) while singing the song.

As of November 20, 2010 the music video for "Anata no Koibito ni Naritai no Desu" has been viewed over 1,533,000 times on popular video-sharing website YouTube.

Single

The single was released in two versions: a limited edition CD+DVD version, as well as a standard CD only version. The DVD features the music video for "Anata no Koibito ni Naritai no Desu."

"Marginal Man" is a rock song, recorded with Abe's band for her live performances instead of with a producer. It was written in her second year of high school, and is about the anger Abe felt of feeling like students were experiment subjects. She found it difficult to show her music director the song, due to the confusing changes of tempo and the song's structure. "Aitai yo" is an acoustic ballad, written in Abe's third year of high school. It is written about the same boy as "Anata no Koibito ni Naritai no Desu."

Track listing

Digital Download

Physical single

CD track list
All songs written by Mao Abe.

DVD track list

Chart rankings

Oricon charts (Japan)

Various charts

References

2009 singles
Japanese-language songs
Mao Abe songs
2009 songs
Pony Canyon singles